Bhimavaram Municipality is the local self-government in Bhimavaram of the Indian state of Andhra Pradesh. It is classified as a Selection Grade Municipality.

Administration 

The municipality was formed in April 1948 as Grade–III municipality. Over the years, it got upgraded and was constituted finally as Special Grade Municipality in September 2011, with the first ever elected council was formed on August 1949.

The present municipal commissioner of the city is B.R.Satyanarayana and the present chairman is Kotikalapudi Govinda Rao.

Timeline

Civic infrastructure and services 
The municipality takes certain measures such as, prevent spreading of diseases, motor pumping of stagnant flood water during heavy rains, improving drainage channels and pipelines etc.

Awards and achievements 
The city is one among the 31 cities in the state to be a part of water supply and sewerage services mission known as Atal Mission for Rejuvenation and Urban Transformation (AMRUT). In 2015, as per the Swachh Bharat Abhiyan of the Ministry of Urban Development, Bhimavaram Municipality was ranked 342nd in the country.

See also 
 List of municipalities in Andhra Pradesh

References 

1948 establishments in India
Government agencies established in 1948
Municipal Councils in Andhra Pradesh